Sea Point Days is a 2008 documentary film about the Cape Town suburb of Sea Point, directed by François Verster.

Synopsis 
Alongside the southernmost urban centre in Africa, separating city from ocean, lays a very special strip of land. Set against the beautiful backdrop of the Atlantic Ocean on one side and Signal Hill on the other, the Sea Point Promenade and the public swimming pools in its centre  forms a space unlike any in Cape Town. Once a bastion of Apartheid exclusivity, it is now unique in its apparently easy mix of age, race, gender, religion, wealth status, and sexual orientation. Somehow, this space has become one in which all South Africans feel they have a right to exist, and the possibility of happiness in a divided world seems feasible. But what is the reality of those coming here? How do people see their past, their present in this space and their future in this country?

The film had its world premiere at the Toronto International Film Festival.

References

External links

Distributor's website

2008 films
South African documentary films
2008 documentary films
Documentary films about apartheid
Films set in Cape Town
Documentary films about cities